The Scoglio della Malghera is a small island belonging to the Borromean Islands of Lake Maggiore, one of the main subalpine lakes of northern Italy. It is located halfway between Isola Bella and Isola dei Pescatori, in the comune of Stresa.

References

Islands of Piedmont
San Giovanni
Stresa